The Seafarer 46 is an American sailboat that was designed by Sparkman & Stephens as a cruiser and first built in 1967.

The Seafarer 46 is probably a development of the Seafarer 45.

Production
The design was built by Seafarer Yachts in the United States, starting in 1967, but it is now out of production.

The boat was offered complete and ready-to-sail, or in various stages of completion.

Design
The Seafarer 46 is a recreational keelboat, built predominantly of fiberglass, with wood trim. It has a masthead yawl rig or optional masthead sloop rig, with a fixed fin keel. It displaces  and carries  of lead ballast.

The boat is fitted with a Universal  diesel engine for docking and maneuvering.

See also
List of sailing boat types

References

Keelboats
1960s sailboat type designs
Sailing yachts
Sailboat type designs by Sparkman and Stephens
Sailboat types built by Seafarer Yachts